The 1982 Intercontinental Cup was an association football match played on 12 December 1982 between Peñarol, winners of the 1982 Copa Libertadores, and Aston Villa, winners of the 1981–82 European Cup. The match was played at the National Stadium in Tokyo. It was Aston Villa's first appearance into the competition, whereas it was Peñarol's fourth appearance after the victories in 1961 and 1966, and the defeat in 1960.

Jair was named as man of the match.

Match details

|valign="top" width="50%"|

|}

See also
1982–83 Aston Villa F.C. season

References

Intercontinental Cup
Intercontinental Cup
Intercontinental Cup
Intercontinental Cup (football)
Intercontinental Cup 1982
Intercontinental Cup 1982
Intercontinental Cup (football) matches hosted by Japan
Inter
Inter
Sports competitions in Tokyo
December 1982 sports events in Asia
1982 in Tokyo
1982 in association football